Mike Keta (born 23 April 1983), known as Gjetan Keta, is an Albanian professional boxer who competes as a middleweight. He is trained by his brother Ismail Keta, who was a professional kickboxer.

Professional career
In 2014, Keta expressed his desire to wrestle a match in his hometown, Bulqizë. It was announced that he will defend his WBC Eurasia Pacific Boxing Council middleweight title against the Russian boxer Marat Khuzeev on 18 October 2014 at Bulqiza Arena. There, Keta beat Khuzeev by knockouting him in the third round.

Professional boxing record

References

External links

Living people
1983 births
Middleweight boxers
People from Bulqizë
Albanian male boxers
Albanian expatriates in Germany